The San Diego Growlers are a professional Ultimate team that plays in the West Division of the American Ultimate Disc League (AUDL). They played their first season in 2015.

History
When the American Ultimate Disc League showed interest in expanding to the West Coast, three local club Ultiamte players explored club interest in the San Diego area and eventually bought the franchise territory rights to the area, beginning the history of the Growlers. The AUDL officially announced the Growlers as an expansion team in October 2014, noting that the team's name has a dual meaning as a reference to both the animal and the craft beer scene.

While the Growlers experienced a moderate amount of success in the early history of the team, a rivalry quickly formed with the Los Angeles Aviators, the closest team to the Growlers, which was also established before the 2015 season.

In 2018, the Growlers advanced to the AUDL playoffs for the first time, falling to division rival Los Angeles in the West Division finals.

In 2019, two-time AUDL MVP Goose Helton joined the team after playing with Raleigh in 2018.  The Growlers finished with a 10-2 regular season record to clinch the top seed in the West Division playoffs.  They hosted their SoCal rival Los Angeles Aviators and defeated them in the playoffs to secure their first AUDL playoff win and Championship Weekend appearance in San Jose.  San Diego would eventually lose in the semi-finals to the Dallas Roughnecks.

The 2020 season was eventually canceled due to the global pandemic, but the AUDL West Division underwent realignment with the addition of the Dallas Roughnecks and Austin Sol.

In 2021, the San Diego Growlers won the regular season title with yet another 10-2 record. They hosted and defeated the Dallas Roughnecks in the West Division Championship game to advance to AUDL Championship Weekend in Washington, DC.  San Diego would eventually lose in the semi-finals to the 2019 AUDL Champion New York Empire.

References

External links
Talkn' Growlers podcast

2015 establishments in California
Ultimate teams established in 2015
Sports teams in California
Ultimate (sport) teams
Sports in San Diego